Stenocercus angel is a species of lizard of the Tropiduridae family. It is found in Ecuador.

References

Stenocercus
Reptiles described in 2000
Endemic fauna of Ecuador
Reptiles of Ecuador